G. Timothy Johnson (born July 9, 1936) is an American academic, pastor, physician, television journalist, and writer who, as "Dr. Tim Johnson", is known to television viewers as the longtime Chief Medical Correspondent for ABC News on the ABC television network.

Education
Johnson received his undergraduate degree from Augustana College in Rock Island, Illinois, where he earned Phi Beta Kappa honors.  In 1963, he graduated from North Park Theological Seminary in Chicago, Illinois and became an ordained minister with the Evangelical Covenant Church.

After two years in the ministry, he entered medical school and graduated summa cum laude from Albany Medical College in Albany, New York, and subsequently received a master's degree in public health from Harvard University in Cambridge, Massachusetts.

Medical career
For many years he has been a member of the faculty of the Harvard Medical School at Harvard University and on the staff of Massachusetts General Hospital, a teaching hospital of the Harvard Medical School and a biomedical research facility in Boston, Massachusetts.

Television career

Early television career
Johnson started his television career in the 1970s at WRGB-TV in Schenectady, NY while at Albany Medical Center. He moved to Boston in 1972 and became a charter staffer at newly-signed-on WCVB-Channel 5's Sunday Open House with a live, weekly segment interviewing other medical professionals about current medical issues.  He also hosted "House Call", a half-hour weekly series on answering health-related questions from viewers and interviewing doctors and nurses on various health topics.  The show was popular and won WCVB-TV an Emmy.

He later became host of HealthBeat, a national health TV magazine program, from 1982 to 1984.

ABC News
In 1975, he joined ABC News as the medical reporter, and later became the "Medical Editor" of Good Morning America (GMA), ABC News's morning-news-and-talk program upon its première on November 3, 1975. In over three decades at ABC News, he has reported for their various programs including World News Tonight, a daily evening-news program; Nightline, a late-night hard and soft news program; 20/20, a prime-time television-newsmagazine program.

Currently, Dr. Jennifer Ashton is the Chief Medical Editor for ABC News; however, Johnson still serves as a correspondent.  Typically, though not exclusively, Ashton reports on developments in nutrition and pediatrics, while Johnson focuses on health issues for senior adults.

Retirement
Johnson retired from ABC in 2010.

Johnson retired from WCVB at the end of 2012.

Ministry
Johnson continues as a Pastor in the Evangelical Covenant Church.

Awards 
Johnson was inducted as a Laureate of The Lincoln Academy of Illinois, and awarded the Order of Lincoln (the State’s highest honor) by the Governor of Illinois in 2013 in the area of Communications.

Bibliography
Johnson published a book Finding God in the Questions:  A Personal Journey (2004) (InterVarsity Press) describing his journey of how he became a Christian, and answering a series of questions, such as "Why Bother With Religion and the Bible?" and "What Did Jesus Teach?"

Notes

External links

Staff writer (2005-10-10).  "Dr. G. Timothy Johnson.  Evangelical Covenant Church.  Accessed 2009-09-29.

1936 births
Albany Medical College alumni
American Protestant ministers and clergy
American medical journalists
American non-fiction writers
Physicians from Massachusetts
American television reporters and correspondents
Augustana College (Illinois) alumni
Harvard School of Public Health alumni
Harvard Medical School faculty
Living people
North Park Theological Seminary alumni
Place of birth missing (living people)
ABC News personalities